Jennersdorf is a town in Burgenland, Austria, and capital of the district of Jennersdorf.

Geography
Cadastral communities are Grieselstein, Henndorf im Burgenland, Jennersdorf and Rax.

Population

References

External links 
 Official Web site

Cities and towns in Jennersdorf District
Slovenian communities in Burgenland